Oerane is a genus of butterflies in the family Hesperiidae. Species of the genus are found in the Indomalayan realm.

Species
Oerane microthyrus Mabille, 1883 - Burma, Thailand, Malaysia, Borneo, Sumatra, Banka, Java and the Philippines
Oerane pugnans (de Nicéville, 1891) - Indomalayan realm

References

External links
Oerane Elwes & Edwards, 1897 at Markku Savela's Lepidoptera and Some Other Life Forms

Hesperiinae